Geoffrey "Geoff" Shelton (birth registered third ¼ 1940 – August 2012) was an English professional rugby league footballer who played in the 1950s and 1960s.

Background
Geoff Shelton's birth was registered in Leeds district, West Riding of Yorkshire, England, he was landlord of the Coach and Horses public house at 459 Huddersfield Road, Waterhead, Oldham, OL4 2HT, he died aged 72, and his funeral was held at Harrogate Crematorium, Wetherby Road, Harrogate at 1pm on Friday August 2012.

Playing career

International honours
Geoff Shelton won caps for Great Britain while at Hunslet in 1964 against France (2 matches), in 1965 against New Zealand (3 matches), and on the 1966 Great Britain Lions tour against Australia (2 matches).

County honours
Geoff Shelton won cap(s) for Yorkshire while at Hunslet.

Challenge Cup Final appearances
Geoff Shelton played right-, i.e. number 3, and scored a try in Hunslet's 16-20 defeat by Wigan in the 1965 Challenge Cup Final during the 1964–65 season at Wembley Stadium, London on Saturday 8 May 1965, in front of a crowd of 89,016.

County Cup Final appearances
Geoff Shelton played right-, i.e. number 3, and scored a try in Hunslet's 12-2 victory over Hull Kingston Rovers in the 1962 Yorkshire County Cup Final during the 1968–69 season at Headingley Rugby Stadium, Leeds on Saturday 27 October 1962, and played right-, i.e. number 3, in the 8-17 defeat by Bradford Northern in the 1965 Yorkshire County Cup Final during the 1965–66 season at Headingley Rugby Stadium, Leeds on Saturday 16 October 1965.

Club career
Geoff Shelton was transferred from Hunslet to Oldham in 1966 for a transfer fee of £6,250 (based on increases in average earnings, this would be approximately £244,600 in 2013), in February 1968 he was transferred from Oldham to Warrington for £2,500 (also stated as £3,000), before retiring due to injury.

References

External links
(archived by web.archive.org) The funeral of former…
(archived by web.archive.org) 19/08/2012 Hunslet Hawks RLFC vs Dewsbury Rams
Statistics at orl-heritagetrust.org.uk  
Statistics at thisiswarrington.co.uk

1940 births
2012 deaths
English rugby league players
Great Britain national rugby league team players
Hunslet F.C. (1883) players
Oldham R.L.F.C. players
Place of death missing
Rugby league centres
Rugby league players from Leeds
Warrington Wolves players
Yorkshire rugby league team players